Hatib ibn Abi Balta'ah was one of the sahaba, and was sent by Muhammad with a letter to Muqawqis, an Egyptian Coptic Christian official. He returned with gifts, including two slaves, Maria al-Qibtiyya and her sister Sirin. Muhammad took Maria as a right hands possession.

A veteran of the Battle of Badr, it was discovered that he had sent a secret letter to the Quraish detailing Muhammad's movements. When confronted, he begged for understanding explaining that he had only hoped the Quraysh tribe would help protect his family who were residing in Mecca in return, because unlike other Sahabi his family did not have security as he did not have any blood ties with the Quraysh. While Umar ibn Khattab sought the Muhammad's permission to kill Balta'ah, Muhammad said that it was unnecessary, as God may have forgiven all veterans of Badr, and knew the sincerity of his heart.

References

Companions of the Prophet